The Gualcamayo mine is one of the largest gold mines in the Argentina and in the world. The mine is located in the north-western part of Argentina in San Juan Province. The mine has estimated reserves of 3.3 million oz of gold.

References 

Gold mines in Argentina
Mines in San Juan Province, Argentina